John Lo Schiavo S.J. (February 25, 1925 – May 15, 2015) was an American Jesuit and academic who was the 25th president of the University of San Francisco from 1977 until 1991 and later a USF chancellor.

Biography
A lifelong resident of San Francisco, Lo Schiavo earned bachelor's and master's degrees in philosophy from Gonzaga University, and a licentiate in sacred theology from Alma College. He came to USF in 1950 as a philosophy instructor. In 1958, he became vice principal of Brophy College Preparatory in Phoenix.  He returned to USF in 1962 as dean of students, becoming vice president of student affairs in 1966.

In 1968, he became president of Bellarmine College Preparatory in San Jose, at the same time becoming a member of USF's board of trustees. He became board chairman from 1970 to 1973, and rector of the USF Jesuit community in 1975. In 1977 he was elected to the first of three five-year terms as president.

During his tenure, he oversaw several major capital campaigns, including expansions to the law school and the building of a new campus recreation center. He was named chancellor in 1991, a post he held until his death in May 2015.

Outside of USF, he may be best known for having made the decision to shut down the school's powerful men's basketball program in 1982.  The program had two NCAA titles and three Final Fours to its credit, but had been under nearly constant scrutiny from the NCAA for most of the second half of the 1970s. In 1980,  Lo Schiavo gave new coach Pete Barry an ultimatum—unless he ran a clean program, it would be shut down.  In 1982, All-American Quintin Dailey was arrested for sexually assaulting a female resident assistant.  During the investigation, he admitted taking a no-show job from a USF donor. Lo Schiavo had seen enough, and on July 29 announced that the men's basketball program would be shut down. In his view, this step was necessary to repair the damage to USF's reputation. The Dons would not return to the court until 1985.

Lo Schiavo, or "Father Lo," as he is popularly known, was a much-beloved figure at USF.  In 2010, USF broke ground on a new science building and named it the John Lo Schiavo Center for Science and innovation in Lo Schiavo's honor.

See also

References

External links
 John Lo Schiavo Center for Science and Innovation

1925 births
2015 deaths
20th-century American Jesuits
21st-century American Jesuits
Gonzaga University alumni
People from San Francisco
American Roman Catholic priests
Presidents of the University of San Francisco
Catholics from California